Swift Carbon Pro Cycling Brasil is a Brazilian cycling team established in 2022.

Team roster

References

UCI Continental Teams (America)
Cycling teams based in Brazil
Cycling teams established in 2022